Martine Larocque Gulick is an American politician from the state of Vermont who will represent the Chittenden Central district in the Vermont Senate from January 2023. A member of the Democratic Party, she previously served on the Burlington school board.

References

Living people
Democratic Party Vermont state senators
Women state legislators in Vermont
21st-century American politicians
21st-century American women politicians
Year of birth missing (living people)